John Levy may refer to:

John Levy (musician) (1912–2012), American jazz double-bassist and businessman
John Levy (philosopher) (died 1976), British mystic, artist, and musician

See also
Jon Levy (disambiguation)